Mohammad Taghi Falsafi was an Iranian Ayatollah and preacher. He was a campaigner against the regime of Mohammad Reza Shah Pahlavi. Many of his lectures was about psychology, ethics and mental development. During the mid-1950s Falsafi strongly campaigned against the Baháʼí Faith, promoting conspiracies of a potential Baháʼí takeover and inciting an attack on a Baháʼí temple. His anti-Baháʼí speeches were broadcast on the radio during the month of Ramazan.

Biography 
Mohammad Taghi Falsafi was born in a religious family on April 11, 1908 in Tehran. His father, Mohammad Reza Tonekaboni was a teacher in Tehran hawza. Falsafi started to preach when he was 16 years old. He married his cousin.

Death 
He died on 18 December 1998. His grave is located in the Shah-Abdol-Azim shrine in Rey.

Works 
 Explanation of Makarem al-Akhlaq:
The first volume and the second volume was published by the Islamic Culture Publications Office in 1991 and 1992 respectively.
 Resurrection in view of spirit and material:
The book included series of Falsafi's lectures in Ramadan 1971. The book is three volumes that published by the Islamic Culture Publications Office.
 Young in view of rationality and sensibility:
This book included part of Falsafi's speeches. The book included the value of youth, elegance of youth, the opportunity of youth, respect for the young character, development of young personality, young and leisure.
 Child in view of heredity and upbringing
 Adults and young in view of thoughts and desires
 Morality in view of coexistence and human values
 Ayat-ul-Kursi heavenly messages of monotheism

See also
 Persecution of Baháʼís

References

External links

 Mohammad Taghi Falsafi's Brief Biography
 MOHAMMAD TAGHI FALSAFI, Archives of Bahai Persecution in Iran

Iranian ayatollahs
Iranian writers
1908 births
1998 deaths
Shia Islamists
People from Mazandaran Province
People from Tonekabon